The 1968 North Carolina lieutenant gubernatorial election was held on November 5, 1968. Democratic nominee Hoyt Patrick Taylor Jr. defeated Republican nominee Don H. Garren with 55.36% of the vote.

Primary elections
Primary elections were held on May 4, 1968.

Democratic primary

Candidates
Hoyt Patrick Taylor Jr., former Speaker of the North Carolina House of Representatives
Margaret T. Harper
Frank M. Matlock

Results

Republican primary

Candidates
Don H. Garren, State Representative
Trosper N. Combs

Results

General election

Candidates
Hoyt Patrick Taylor Jr., Democratic
Don H. Garren, Republican

Results

References

1968
Gubernatorial
North Carolina